Saeed bin Naser Alghamdi (born 28 December 1961) is a Saudi academic, Islamic scholar, and researcher of contemporary religious doctrines. He was born in the Kingdom of Saudi Arabia and is known for his publications on various Islamic topics.

Early life and education
Alghamdi was born on 28 December 1961 in Saudi Arabia. In 1982, he completed his bachelor's degree from the College of Sharia and Fundamentals of Religion. Then in 1990, he earned a master's degree in Islamic creed and contemporary religious doctrine from the Imam Mohammad Ibn Saud Islamic University (IMSIU). Later, in 1999 he obtained his Ph.D. from King Khalid University in Islamic creed and contemporary religious doctrine.

Career
Alghamdi started his career in 1999 as an assistant teacher in the Islamic Creed and Contemporary Religious Doctrine Department at King Khalid University.

He wrote publications and books in several fields, including terminology, culture shock, heresy, characteristics of Allah, prophecies, ideology, faith, and preachers.

Many of his articles were recognized in Muhajat's corner. He also wrote for the Al-Risala newspaper, publishing in the Awassim corner.

Recently, he worked as a lecturer at King Abdulaziz University in Jeddah, Saudi Arabia.

As of 2022, Alghamdi is working as a chairman of the Board of Trustees at Sanad Human Rights Foundation and Supervisor of the Scientific Research Unit. In addition, he is serving as the General Secretary of Muntada Al-Ulama.

Research and writing
In 2000, Alghamdi collaborated on a project, How to Administer Dialogue Between Civilizations, presented by King Khalid University. In the same year, he performed research on the project What We Should and Shouldn't Take from Contemporary Sciences, which was delivered in a lecture at the university.

In 1996, he delivered research in a scientific seminar on The Rules of Sharia and New Terminology. Later in 1999, Alghamdi worked on a project called The Origins of Contemporary Thought (Modernity) and delivered its summary at a literary club in Abha.

In 2016, he wrote for Al-Madina and Al-Risala newspapers.

Publications
His publications include:

Questions of Terminology
Restrictions when dealing with dissentious prophecies
Introduction to civilization and cultural shocks
The reality and rules of Heresy
Proving the characteristics of Allah; His face and hands
Baath party, its history, and ideology
How preachers cheat
How attitudes to modernity deviate from faith
The Congregation

References

Senior Islah Party’s leader escape Saudi Arabia to Turkey
Two years after Khashoggi murder, Saudi Crown Prince reveals his fears
Saudi opposition party, exiled activists, welcome US Khashoggi report
Arabic press review: Saudi Arabia bans families of detainees from travel

External links

Twitter
YouTube

Living people
1961 births
Saudi Arabian academics
Saudi Arabian writers
Umm al-Qura University alumni
Imam Muhammad ibn Saud Islamic University alumni
Saudi Arabian Sunni Muslim scholars of Islam
King Khalid University alumni
Academic staff of King Khalid University
Academic staff of King Abdulaziz University
Islamic studies scholars